Viktor Verschaeve (born 3 August 1998) is a Belgian cyclist, who currently rides for UCI Continental team .

Major results
2015
 1st Stage 1 Keizer der Juniores
2016
 2nd La Route des Géants
2018
 5th Road race, National Under–23 Road Championships
 5th Circuit de Wallonie
 9th Overall Grand Prix Priessnitz spa
2019
 2nd Liège–Bastogne–Liège U23
 5th Flèche Ardennaise
 8th Overall Ronde de l'Isard
 9th Overall Giro Ciclistico d'Italia
2020
 1st Stage 2 Tour de Savoie Mont-Blanc

References

External links

1998 births
Living people
Belgian male cyclists
People from Brasschaat
Cyclists from Antwerp Province